The 1970 All-Ireland Minor Hurling Championship was the 40th staging of the All-Ireland Minor Hurling Championship since its establishment by the Gaelic Athletic Association in 1928.

Cork entered the championship as the defending champions.

On 6 September 1970 Cork won the championship following a 5-19 to 2-09 defeat of Galway in the All-Ireland final. This was their second All-Ireland title in-a-row and their 10th championship title overall.

Results

Leinster Minor Hurling Championship

Semi-finals

Final

Munster Minor Hurling Championship

First round

Semi-finals

Final

Ulster Minor Hurling Championship

Final

All-Ireland Minor Hurling Championship

Semi-finals

Final

References

External links
 All-Ireland Minor Hurling Championship: Roll Of Honour

Minor
All-Ireland Minor Hurling Championship